Rónán Hession (born 1975), known as Mumblin' Deaf Ro, is an Irish blues musician and novelist.

He lives in Dublin with his wife and two children and supports Watford Football Club. He is Assistant General Secretary of the Department of Social Protection.

Musical career (as Mumblin' Def Ro)
Hession has performed in several bands in Dublin: Rinty, Boxcar,  and The Critters. He also performed under the name of 'Johnny Horsebox'.  As Mumblin' Deaf Ro he had his first release in 2003. His 2012 album Dictionary Crimes was named as Irish album of the year by Nialler9 and the Irish Independent, and was nominated for the Choice Music Prize.

Discography

Albums
 Señor, My Friend (2002)
 The Herring and the Brine (2007)
 Dictionary Crimes (2012)

Publications (as Rónán Hession) 

Hession has to date published two acclaimed novels:

Leonard and Hungry Paul (Bluemoose Books, 2019)     

Panenka (Bluemoose Books, 2021)    

His third, Ghost Mountain, will be published by Bluemoose Books in 2023.

He reviews fiction for the Irish Times, with a particular focus on fiction in translation, and has also written articles for LitHub about writing practice, such as

The quest for kindness is one of literature's great challenges

Awards and recognition 
2019 An Post Irish Book Awards Best Newcomer (shortlist): Leonard and Hungry Paul
2019 Dalkey Festival debut of The Year (shortlist): Leonard and Hungry Paul
2019 Society of Author's debut of The Year (shortlist): Leonard and Hungry Paul
2019 #BooksAreMYBag Book of The Year (shortlist): Leonard and Hungry Paul
2019  Republic of Consciousness Prize 2019 (longlist): Leonard and Hungry Paul
2019 Irish Book Awards Newcomer of The Year (shortlist): Leonard and Hungry Paul

2020 An Post Irish Book Awards Short Story of the Year (longlist) 'The Translator's Funeral'
2020 British Book Awards Debut Book of the Year (finalist): Leonard and Hungry Paul

2021 An Post Irish Book Awards Author of the Year (shortlist) Panenka
2021 An Post Irish Books Award for Novel of the Year (shortlist) Panenka
2021 Books Are My Bag Awards Novel of the Year (shortlist) Panenka
2021 One Dublin One Book: Leonard and Hungry Paul

References

External links 

Mumblin' Deaf Ro on bandcamp
Irish Times author profile https://www.irishtimes.com/culture/books/r%C3%B3n%C3%A1n-hession-i-m-okay-with-writing-books-that-fit-into-my-life-1.4514846
Irish Times author interview  https://www.irishtimes.com/culture/books/my-book-is-a-tribute-to-the-kindness-i-have-experienced-all-my-life-1.3817979

Irish blues guitarists